Stig Sjöstam (born 23 March 1935) is a retired Swedish ice hockey player. Sjöstam was part of the Djurgården Swedish champions' team of 1955.

References

Swedish ice hockey players
Djurgårdens IF Hockey players
1935 births
Living people